Colotis regina, the queen purple tip, regal purple tip, or large violet tip, is a butterfly of the family Pieridae. It is found in the Afrotropical realm.

The wingspan is 45–62 mm. The adults fly year-round.

The larvae feed on Boscia and Capparis species.

References

Colotis at Markku Savela's Lepidoptera and Some Other Life Forms
Seitz, A. Die Gross-Schmetterlinge der Erde 13: Die Afrikanischen Tagfalter. Plate XIII 17

Butterflies described in 1863
regina
Butterflies of Africa
Taxa named by Roland Trimen